Steven Misa (born 8 April 1995, in New Zealand) is a New Zealand rugby union player who plays for the  in Super Rugby. His playing position is hooker. He was announced in the Rebels squad for round 1 in 2020.

Super Rugby statistics

Reference list

External links
itsrugby.co.uk profile

1995 births
New Zealand rugby union players
Living people
Rugby union hookers
New Zealand expatriate rugby union players
Expatriate rugby union players in Australia
Melbourne Rebels players
Waikato rugby union players
North Harbour rugby union players
Otago rugby union players